Massengill is a surname of British origin. Notable people with the surname include:

David Massengill (born 1951), American folk singer
Nathan Massengill (born 1970), American comic book artist
Steve Massengill (born 1966), American politician

See also
 S. E. Massengill Company, American pharmaceutical company

References 

English-language surnames
Surnames
Surnames of British Isles origin
Surnames of English origin